WEC 17: Halloween Fury 4 was a mixed martial arts event promoted by World Extreme Cagefighting on October 14, 2005 at the Tachi Palace Hotel & Casino in Lemoore, California. A light heavyweight tournament was held with the winner being crowned the champion and given a deal with the UFC.

Results

Bracket

1Justin Levens was forced to withdraw due to a shoulder injury. He was replaced by Vernon White. 
2Vernon White was forced to withdraw due to a hand injury. He was replaced by Tait Fletcher.

See also 
 World Extreme Cagefighting
 List of World Extreme Cagefighting champions
 List of WEC events
 2005 in WEC

References

External links
 WEC 17 Results at Sherdog.com

World Extreme Cagefighting events
2005 in mixed martial arts
Mixed martial arts in California
Sports in Lemoore, California
2005 in sports in California